The American Rocketry Challenge is an annual American model rocketry competition for students in grades six to 12 sponsored by the Aerospace Industries Association and the National Association of Rocketry.  Co-sponsors include NASA, United States Department of Defense, the American Association of Physics Teachers and the Civil Air Patrol. Previously known as the "Team America Rocketry Challenge," the name was changed following the 2019 event.

The event receives local and national media coverage and usually draws well-known representatives of the Defense Department, NASA, the FAA, and other government agencies. Past National Fly-Offs have been attended by United States Secretary of Defense Robert Gates, Apollo 11 astronaut Buzz Aldrin, Rocket Boys author Homer Hickam, former NASA Administrator Sean O'Keefe, U.S. Senator Mike Enzi, and former NASA Administrator, Charles Bolden.  

The 2010, 2011, 2013, 2015, and 2016 International Fly-Offs were won by the American winners of TARC.

History
The competition began in 2002 celebration of 100th anniversary of the flight, but due to a high level of interest became an annual occurrence. TARC fosters interest in aerospace engineering careers among its participants, and the National Fly-Off in May is an opportunity for corporations, universities, and the armed services to attract students. The program rebranded in 2019 to the American Rocketry Challenge.

Requirements
The requirements for each year's challenge are announced during the summer. Teams generally meet early in the school year, and must make official qualifying flights by early April. A team only has three chances to fly an official qualification attempt; only scores from flights that meet the contest requirements, are safe, and don't break the egg can be submitted. Typically, about 60 percent of participating teams submit at least one qualification score. The teams with the top 100 qualifying scores submitted in April compete in the National Fly-off that is held during May at Great Meadow in The Plains, Virginia.  

TARC challenges students to design, build and launch rockets that can safely carry one, two, or three raw hen eggs (depending on the year's challenge) and consistently come very close to a specified flight altitude and duration. Success requires excellent design, workmanship, and altitude prediction, which means students can learn about engineering, aerodynamics, meteorology, and computer simulation through the program. Scores are calculated as deductions from the perfect flight; the  lower the score, the better. The sum of the difference between altitude and the target altitude and four times the difference between duration and the target duration. Many teams consistently achieve scores less than 10.

Awards to winning teams

The top 10 teams receive a share of $100,000 in scholarships and prizes, and the top 25 teams are invited to submit a proposal for one of 15 spots in NASA's Student Launch Initiative. There are additional awards sponsored by AIA member corporations in various categories. 

It is starting in 2008, the winners of the U.S. competition have been awarded a trip to either the Paris Air Show or the Farnborough Airshow, courtesy of Raytheon Company, to compete with the winners from other participating countries. The United Kingdom and France currently have similar competitions and compete in the international fly-offs; organizations from Germany, Canada and Japan are in the initial planning stages for starting their own competition.

Awards to the TARC program
The TARC program has picked up the following awards:

In 2013, Marion C. Blakey, President and CEO of the Aerospace Industries Association, and Susan Lavrakas, AIA’s Director of Workforce, received Aviation Week & Space Technology’s Laureate Award in the workforce category for the association’s outstanding STEM education activities, including the Team America Rocketry Challenge. 

In 2014, the National Aeronautic Association named AIA and the National Association of Rocketry (NAR) the 2014 recipients of the Frank G. Brewer Trophy. The award serves to recognize an individual, a group of individuals, or an organization for significant contributions of enduring value to aerospace education in the United States.

In 2015, the National Coalition for Aviation and Space Education (NCASE) selected the Aerospace Industries Association and the National Association of Rocketry to receive its Dr. Mervin K. Strickler Aerospace Education Award, in recognition of their outstanding achievements in the field of aerospace education.

National Flyoff Results

Notes

References

External links 
 
 AIA Press Release - Students Vie For World's Largest Rocket Contest Title

Model rocketry